Beriz Belkić (born 8 September 1946) is a Bosnian former politician who served as the 3rd Bosniak member of the Presidency of Bosnia and Herzegovina from 2001 to 2002.

He also served as Prime Minister of Sarajevo Canton from 1998 to 2001. Belkić was a member of the national House of Representatives on two occasions as well.

Career
Born in Sarajevo on 8 September 1946, Belkić graduated from the faculty of economics with the University of Sarajevo. He served on various administrative positions, on municipal, cantonal and state level. His first serious political position was that of Prime Minister of Sarajevo Canton, serving from 12 November 1998 until 15 February 2001.

Following the 2000 parliamentary election, Belkić was elected as a parliament member in the House of Representatives. On 30 March 2001, he was elected by the parliament to replace Halid Genjac as a substitute member of the Presidency of Bosnia and Herzegovina, following the withdrawal of Alija Izetbegović. Following the 2006 general election, Belkić again became a member of the House of Representatives, this time serving in parliament until 9 December 2014.

He is a founding member of the Party for Bosnia and Herzegovina.

Personal life
Beriz is married to Azra Belkić. They live in Sarajevo.

References

External links
Website of the Presidency

1946 births
Living people
Politicians from Sarajevo
Bosniaks of Bosnia and Herzegovina
Bosnia and Herzegovina Muslims
University of Sarajevo alumni
Party for Bosnia and Herzegovina politicians
Members of the Presidency of Bosnia and Herzegovina
Chairmen of the Presidency of Bosnia and Herzegovina
Members of the House of Representatives (Bosnia and Herzegovina)
Chairmen of the House of Representatives (Bosnia and Herzegovina)